Rock Creek Township is a township (T9&10S R16E) in Jefferson County, Kansas, USA.  As of the 2000 census, its population was 2,718.

Geography
Rock Creek Township covers an area of 54.68 square miles (141.62 square kilometers); of this, 0.5 square miles (1.3 square kilometers) or 0.92 percent is water. The streams of Claywell Creek, Rock Creek and Tick Creek run through this township.

Cities and towns
 Meriden

Unincorporated towns
 Rock Creek
(This list is based on USGS data and may include former settlements.)

Adjacent townships
 Delaware Township (northeast)
 Fairview Township (east)
 Ozawkie Township (east)
 Kaw Township (south)
 Soldier Township, Shawnee County (southwest)
 Douglas Township, Jackson County (west)

Major highways
 K-4
 K-92

References
 U.S. Board on Geographic Names (GNIS)
 United States Census Bureau cartographic boundary files

External links
 US-Counties.com
 City-Data.com

Townships in Jefferson County, Kansas
Townships in Kansas